France Gall (commonly called Mes premières vraies vacances after the opening track) is the second album by French singer France Gall. It was released on a 12-inch LP in August 1964.

Track listing

References

France Gall albums
Philips Records albums
1964 albums